is a city located in Saitama Prefecture, Japan. , the city had an estimated population of 54,304 in 23,487 households and a population density of 930 persons per km².

Geography
Hanyū is located in the most northern part of Saitama Prefecture, with the Tone River on its northern border. Before the river was redirected to its current course to control flooding, it used to flow through the city. This river was used as a major shipping route for locally produced textiles and goods from further up river. Hanyū flourished as a stopping point on the long ride toward Tokyo. Today only an irrigation channel remains in the approximate location of the original river path.

Surrounding municipalities
Saitama Prefecture
 Kazo
 Gyōda
Gunma Prefecture
 Itakura
 Meiwa

Climate
Hanyū has a Humid subtropical climate (Köppen Cfa) characterized by warm summers and cool winters with light to no snowfall.  The average annual temperature in Hanyū is 14.6 °C. The average annual rainfall is 1300 mm with September as the wettest month. The temperatures are highest on average in August, at around 26.7 °C, and lowest in January, at around 3.4 °C.

Demographics
Per Japanese census data, the population of Hanyū peaked in around the year 2000 and has declined slightly over the past 20 years.

History
The village of Hanyū was created within Kitasaitama District, Saitama with the establishment of the modern municipalities system on April 1, 1889. On September 1, 1954 Hanyū merged with the neighboring villages of Shingō, Sukage, Iwase, Kawamata, Iizumi, and Tegobayashi and was elevated to city status. The village of Chiyoda was annexed on April 1, 1959.

Government
Hanyū has a mayor-council form of government with a directly elected mayor and a unicameral city council of 14 members. Hanyū contributes one member to the Saitama Prefectural Assembly. In terms of national politics, the city is part of Saitama 12th district of the lower house of the Diet of Japan.

Economy
Traditional industries of Hanyū included textile dying and clothing production. The area was famous of its indigo production in the Edo period.
Akebono Brake Industry is headquartered in Hanyū.

Education
Saitama Junshin Junior College
 Hanyū has 11 public elementary schools and three public middle schools operated by the city government, and four public high schools operated by the Saitama Prefectural Board of Education.The prefecture also operates one special education school for the handicapped.

Transportation

Railway
 Tobu Railway - Tobu Isesaki Line
 -  
 Chichibu Railway – Chichibu Main Line
 -  -

Highways
  – Hanyū Interchange – Hanyū Parking Area

Local attractions
Saitama Aquarium

Twin towns and sister cities
  Baguio, Philippines, since February 11, 1969 
  Kaneyama, Fukushima, Japan (friendship city since 1982)
  Durbuy, Belgium, since November 4, 1994
  Millbrae, CA, USA (2014)

References

External links
 
Official Website 

Cities in Saitama Prefecture
Hanyū, Saitama